Eel noodles is a signature Taiwanese noodle dish consisting of thick, chewy, egg noodles with young yellow or finless eels, and a brown sweet and sour sauce or viscous soup. The dish originated from the food capital of Taiwan - Tainan City, which is near the sea. The dish is considered one of the national dishes of Taiwan and can be found in many Taiwanese restaurants and night markets all around the country. Eel noodles was featured on the 19 great dishes in Tainan, Taiwan's capital of food by CNN Travel.

Culinary method
Cook the eel first, then stir-fry the eel with black vinegar, sugar, yi mein and eel. Another method of dry stir fry is to cook the noodle first, and then mix the fried eel with it.

See also

 Taiwanese cuisine
 Ta-a mi
 Oyster vermicelli

References

Taiwanese noodle dishes
National dishes
Taiwanese cuisine